Matthew Reynolds is an American college baseball coach and former player. Reynolds is the head coach of the UMass Minutemen baseball team. Reynolds played college baseball at the University of Maine for coach Paul Kostacopoulos before transferring to the University of Massachusetts Amherst to play for coach Mike Stone from 2003 to 2004.

Playing career
Reynolds attended Boston Latin School in Boston, Massachusetts. Reynolds then enrolled at the University of Maine, to play college baseball for the Maine Black Bears baseball team.

As a freshman at the University of Maine in 2001, Reynolds had a .317 batting average, a .360 on-base percentage (OBP) and a .423 SLG.

As a sophomore in 2002, Reynolds batted .287 with a .383 SLG, 1 home run, and 14 RBIs.

In the 2003 season as a junior, Reynolds transferred to the University of Massachusetts Amherst to play for the UMass Minutemen baseball team and hit 12 doubles and 13 RBIs.

Reynolds had his best season as a senior in 2004, leading the team in home runs (7) and was a key contribute with RBIs (39), batting average (.293) and slugging (.461). He was named All-Atlantic 10 Conference baseball tournament Team.

Coaching career
In 2005, Reynolds began his coaching career as a graduate assistant at Massachusetts. He spent 3 years with the program. In the summer of 2007, Reynolds agreed to join his former coach, Paul Kostacopoulos as an assistant coach for the Navy Midshipmen baseball program. Reynolds spent 7 season with the Midshipmen until he was hired as the head coach of the Washington College Shoreman baseball program on July 8, 2014. The Shoremen compiled a 59–50–1 record under Reynolds.

On May 26, 2017, Reynolds was hired as the head coach at UMass. The Minutemen finished the 2018 season 15–29.

Head coaching record

See also
 List of current NCAA Division I baseball coaches

References

External links
Navy Midshipmen bio
Massachusetts Minutemen bio

Living people
Baseball first basemen
Baseball third basemen
Maine Black Bears baseball players
UMass Minutemen baseball players
UMass Minutemen baseball coaches
Navy Midshipmen baseball coaches
Washington College Shoremen baseball coaches
Year of birth missing (living people)
Baseball players from Boston